Charles Simon or Charles-Simon may refer to:

Simon as surname
 Charles Martin Simon (1941–2007), better known as Charlie Nothing, American musician, musical instrument maker and writer
 Charles Simon (tennis), Swiss tennis player
 Charles Simon (actor) (1909-2002) British actor

Simon as second name
 Charles-Simon Pradier (1786–1847), Swiss engraver
 Charles-Simon Catel (1773–1830), French composer and educator
 Charles Simon Clermont-Ganneau (1846–1923), French orientalist
 Charles Simon Favart (1710–1792), French playwright

See also
 Charles Simons (disambiguation)